Myrcia simulata is a species of plant in the family Myrtaceae. It is found in South America from south-eastern Colombia to northern and western Bolivia.

References

simulata
Near threatened plants
Taxonomy articles created by Polbot